Nachon was the name of the owner of a threshing-floor, which was nearby to the place where Uzzah was slain.
 2 Samuel 6:6
 1 Chronicles 13:9 It is called Kidon's (or Chidon's in some versions) threshing-floor

Nachon means prepared

References
 Easton's Bible Dictionary
 ChristianAnswers.net
 New International Version Bible

People of the Kingdom of Israel (united monarchy)